Muzika za decu (trans. Music for Children) is a studio album released in 1995 by Montenegrin-Serbian musician Rambo Amadeus.

Track listing
Lyrics by Ljubivoje Ršumović
 "Popaj i Badža"
 "Kojot Kosta"
 "Pera Detlić"
 "Kapetan Kuka"
 "Gargamel"
 "Patak Dača"
 "Hromi Daba"
 "Tom i Džeri"
 "Duško Dugouško"
 "Braća Dalton"
 "Sex"
 "Abvgd"

Personnel 
Bass guitar — Bata Božanić
Saxophone — Neša Petrović
Drums — Trut
Guitar, Vocals — Rasmc

External links
Muzika za decu on Rambo Amadeus' official web site

1995 albums
Rambo Amadeus albums